is a 1958 Japanese color drama film directed by Koreyoshi Kurahara and produced by Nikkatsu.

Cast 
 Yujiro Ishihara
 Mari Shiraki
 Sanae Nakahara
 Kō Nishimura
 Shinsuke Ashida

References

External links 
 

1958 films
Films directed by Koreyoshi Kurahara
Nikkatsu films
1950s Japanese films